Matthews v Chicory Marketing Board (Vic), is a High Court of Australia case that considered section 90 of the Australian Constitution, which prohibits States from levying excise (taxes). Although the meaning of excise was considered in Peterswald v Bartley, this case significantly broadened its reach.

In this case, the law in question was a Victorian tax on producers of chicory, which was measured at the rate of one pound per half-acre, of land planted with the crop. The minority in this case, consisting of Latham CJ and McTiernan J, followed the Peterswald definition and held that an excise must have some relation to the quantity or value of the goods.

On the contrary, the majority, whose principal judgment was delivered by Dixon J, allowed this extension. After examining the history of excise in England, his Honour concluded that the definition in Peterswald may be too narrow. All that is required is that the "tax must bear a close relation to the production or manufacture, the sale or the consumption of goods and must be of such a nature as to affect them as the subjects of manufacture or production or as articles of commerce". Hence, although the tax in this case did not directly refer to the quantity or value of the chicory produced, the land area has a "natural, although not a necessary" relation to the quantity produced, and it is a "controlling element". This was formulated with reference to the framers of the Constitution, who adopted an excise as "a tax directly affecting commodities".

See also 

 Section 90 of the Constitution of Australia
 Australian constitutional law

References 

 Winterton, G. et al. Australian federal constitutional law: commentary and materials, 1999. LBC Information Services, Sydney.

High Court of Australia cases
1938 in Australian law
1938 in case law
Australian constitutional law
Excise in the Australian Constitution cases